Spira is a surname with a variety of origins. In Germany, the surname Spira originated as a corruption of Speyer, the name of a town in the Rhineland. It is one of a number of Jewish surnames that originated this way, along with the better-known Shapiro. Notable people with this name include:

Surname
 Camilla Spira (1906–1997), German film actress
 Chaim Elazar Spira (1868–1937), Polish Orthodox rabbi
 Elijah Spira (1660–1712), Czech rabbi
 Ella Spira, English composer
 Fred Spira (1924–2007), American photography innovator
 Fritz Spira (1881–1943), Austrian actor
 Harry Spira (died c. 2009), Australian veterinarian
 Henry Spira (1927–1988), animal rights activist
 Howard Spira (born 1959), American gambler and mobster
 Joel Spira  (born 1981), Swedish actor
 Joel Spira (businessman) (1927–2015), American inventor and businessman
 Jonathan Spira (born 1961), American researcher and industry analyst
 Julie Spira, American author and media personality
 Lotte Spira (1883–1943), German actress
 Michael Spira (born 1944), British medical doctor
 Nathan Nata Spira (1585–1633), Polish rabbi and kabbalist
 Phyllis Spira (1943–2008), South African ballet dancer 
 Rupert Spira (born 1960), English studio potter
 Steffie Spira (1908–1995), Austrian-born German actress
 Thomas Spira (1923–2005), Canadian historian
 Yisroel Spira (1889–1989), Polish-American rabbi

Given name
 Spira Grujić (born 1971), Serbian football defender

See also 
Spyra 
Spera 
Spiro (name)   
Spira (car) 
Spira Culture Center 
Shapiro 
Jewish surname

References

Yiddish-language surnames
Jewish surnames